Experiment, formerly called Microryza, is a US website for crowdfunding science-based research projects. Researchers can post their research projects to solicit pledges. Experiment works on the all-or-nothing funding model. The backers are only charged if the research projects reach their funding target during a set time frame. In February 2014, the site changed its name from Microryza to Experiment.com.

It was founded in 2012 by Denny Luan and Cindy Wu, former University of Washington researchers. The former name Microryza is inspired by Mycorrhizae and symbiotic fungi that lives in the roots of plants.

Unlike the popular crowdfunding site Kickstarter, backers of Experiment projects do not get tangible rewards for backing. Researchers share the scientific process directly with the backers and become a part of the project.

Experiment charges 11-13% in fees (8% for platform fees and 3-5% for payment processing) only if the campaign is successful. If the campaign does not reach the funding goal, no one is charged.

As of Aug 26, 2014, they passed $1M raised on their platform.

As of Aug 7, 2015, more than 5,000 projects were launched and 336 of them were funded.

As of Nov 20, 2019, more than 760 project were funded, raising nearly $8 million in pledges from more than 41,000 backers.

See also
 Comparison of crowd funding services

References

External links

Crowdfunding platforms of the United States
Crowdfunded science
Y Combinator companies
Internet properties established in 2012
2012 establishments in California